Diplopterygium is a genus of ferns in the family Gleicheniaceae.

Phylogeny
, Plants of the World Online recognized the following species:

Phylogeny of Diplopterygium

Unassigned species:

Diplopterygium angustilobum (Holttum) Parris
Diplopterygium brevipinnulum (Holttum) Parris
Diplopterygium bullatum (T.Moore) Parris
Diplopterygium clemensiae (Copel.) Parris
Diplopterygium conversum (Alderw.) Nakai
Diplopterygium deflexum (Holttum) Parris
Diplopterygium elmeri (Copel.) Nakai
Diplopterygium irregulare W.M.Chu & Z.R.He
Diplopterygium norrisii (Mett.) Nakai
Diplopterygium sordidum (Copel.) Parris
Diplopterygium volubile (Jungh.) Nakai

References

Gleicheniales
Fern genera